DWM may refer to:

Computing
 dwm, a window manager for X11
 Desktop Window Manager in Microsoft Windows
 Domain-wall memory, experimental computer memory

Organisations
 Deutsche Waffen und Munitionsfabriken, a munitions company, Karlsruhe, Germany
 Deutsche Waggon und Maschinenfabrik, a German rail and bus manufacturer

Other uses
 Dandy–Walker malformation, a congenital malformation of the brain
Distinguished Warfare Medal, a cancelled US award
 Doctor Who Magazine